Frances Talbot, Countess of Tyrconnell (née Jennings, previously Hamilton;  – 1731), also called La Belle Jennings, was a maid of honour to the Duchess of York and, like her sister Sarah, a famous beauty at the Restoration court. She married first George Hamilton and then Richard Talbot, Earl of Tyrconnell. She was vicereine in Dublin Castle while Tyrconnell was viceroy (lord deputy) of Ireland for James II. She lived through difficult times after the death of her second husband, who was attainted as a Jacobite, but recovered some of his wealth and died a devout Catholic despite having been raised as a Protestant.

Birth and origins 
Frances was born about 1649 at Sandridge, Hertfordshire, England, as the third of the nine children, four sons and five daughters of Richard Jennings and his wife Frances Thornhurst. Her father was a landowner and a Member of Parliament, and so had been her grandfather. Both sat for the Borough of St Albans. Her father sided with the Parliament during the English Civil War.

Her mother was a daughter of Sir Gifford Thornhurst, the first and last Baronet Thornhurst of Agnes Court, and Susan Temple. Frances's parents had married in 1643. Of the nine children only Frances and her sister Sarah are noteworthy. Sarah would become Duchess of Marlborogh.

 
 

The spelling of her maiden name varies widely. All the three following forms were used during her lifetime: Jennings, Jenings, Jenyns.

Restoration court 
Frances Jennings was about 11 when the Restoration (1660) brought the end of the Commonwealth and put Charles II on the throne. In 1664, aged about 15, Jennings was appointed maid of honour to Anne Hyde, the Duchess of York. Anne was the first wife of the James, Duke of York, the younger brother of the King and future King James II. Frances's beauty earned her the nickname "La Belle Jennings." Macaulay describes her as “beautiful Fanny Jennings, the loveliest coquette in the brilliant Whitehall of the Restoration". She figures in the Mémoires du comte de Grammont (Memoirs for short), written by Anthony Hamilton, younger brother of her future husband George Hamilton, which describes the life at the Restoration court. The three oldest of the six Hamilton brothers, James, George, and Anthony, belonged to the inner circle around the King at Whitehall, as they were fashionable young men and had been in exile with him.

An incident in which Jennings disguised herself as an orange seller is told in the Memoirs and also, with less detail, in Pepys's diary. According to the Memoirs, she and her friend Miss Price wanted to consult a fortune-teller incognito. They went out disguising themselves as orange sellers.

Jennings was courted by the Duke of York, the future James II, who thought his wife's maids of honour to be his property, but she refused to play such a role. She was also courted by Richard Talbot and by George Hamilton, second son of Sir George Hamilton.

First marriage and children 
In 1665 Frances Jennings married George Hamilton. At that time George was an officer in the Life Guards. Her marriage resembled that of her husband's elder brother James, for whom the king arranged a marriage with a Protestant girl with the purpose of converting him to that religion. The King seemed to have been concerned about the future of his Catholic friends in the army. The King granted the couple a pension of £500 per year. Hers is the sixth of the seven marriages with which end the Memoirs, written by her husband's brother Antoine Hamilton.

Elizabeth, their first child, was born in 1667 and baptised on 21 March at St Margaret's, Westminster, in an Anglican ceremony.

On 28 September 1667, all Catholic soldiers were dismissed from the Life Guards. Hamilton then took French service. She followed him to France and converted to the Catholic religion.

In 1671 Hamilton recruited a regiment in Ireland and served under Turenne and then under his successors, first Condé and then Luxembourg. Her husband was considered a count in France and she therefore became comtesse Hamilton.

 
The couple seems to have had six children, but the only ones known by name seem to be the following four daughters:

 Elizabeth (1667–1724), married Richard Parsons, 1st Viscount Rosse in 1685, and was mother of Richard Parsons, 1st Earl of Rosse
 Frances (died 1751), married Henry Dillon, 8th Viscount Dillon in 1687
 Mary (1676–1736), married Nicholas Barnewall, 3rd Viscount Barnewall in 1688
 Henrietta seems to have been younger than the three listed above. Not much more is known about her.

Elizabeth, the first daughter, was born in England and baptised following the Anglican rite. She married Viscount Rosse, a Protestant loyal to James II in 1685. Her husband was one of the only five Protestant lay members of the Irish House of Lords of the Patriot Parliament summoned by James II in 1688. The younger daughters were born in France and baptised in the Catholic church. Frances and Mary married Catholic men. Henrietta does not seem to have married.

Early in June 1676 comte Hamilton was killed by a musket-shot in a rear-guard action at the Col de Saverne and she was widowed.

On 7 July Charles II created the widow Baroness Rosse and Countess of Bantry "for life".

Second marriage 

Frances remarried in 1681 in Paris, taking as her second husband an old suitor she had previously rejected: Richard Talbot. Her husband was appointed Lord Deputy of Ireland (viceroy) and the couple lived in Dublin. He oversaw a dramatic expansion of the Irish Army, transforming it from a mainly Protestant to a Catholic force. Talbot was created Earl of Tyrconnell in the peerage of Ireland in 1685 and she became Countess of Tyrconnell.

In 1688 during the Glorious Revolution James II fled England and was replaced with Queen Mary and King William. However, in 1689 James II landed in Ireland trying to regain his kingdoms. Soon after his arrival, on 20 March 1689, he made Tyrconnell a duke and she became duchess. This title is in the Jacobite peerage. Nonetheless, Frances is frequently called Duchess of Tyrconnell. They had no children.

In 1690, after James II's defeat at the Battle of the Boyne, the king fled to their home and was met by Frances. According to later sources, King James remarked, ‘Your countrymen, madam, can run well’ and Lady Tyrconnell replied, ‘Not quite so well as your majesty, for I see that you have won the race’.

In August 1690 Lady Tyrconnell fled to France with her daughters and 40,000 gold coins. She became one of the ladies-in-waiting of Mary of Modena, exiled Queen of England at the Château of Saint-Germain-en-Laye. Her husband stayed in Ireland and died during the Siege of Limerick on 14 August 1691.

Later life 

In 1691 or 1692, after her husband's death, she was allowed to visit England to petition for the possession of the Irish lands that had been settled upon her as her jointure when she married Tyrconnell and which had been confiscated after his attainder in 1689. It might have been at this visit to London that, out of necessity, she had a dressmaker's stall at the New Exchange in the Strand in Westminster. She dressed in white with her face covered by a white mask and was described as "the white milliner". This episode was dramatised by Douglas Jerrold and performed at Covent Garden in 1841 under the title "The white Milliner: A Comedy in two Acts".

Lady Tyrconnell returned to France and was then in 1693 indicted herself of high treason. After Queen Anne had acceded the throne in 1702, she and her stepdaughter, Charlotte Talbot, eventually recovered the lands due to them in 1703 by act of parliament — presumably through her sister Sarah's influence with the Queen. Eventually she retired to the Dominican Convent at Channel Row, Dublin, and lived there as a parlour boarder from 1723–1724. She then built a house on North King Street and obtained the permission to establish a Poor Clares convent in it.

Death and timeline 

In 1731 Frances died in Dublin at the Poor Clares convent that she had founded. She was buried on 9 March in St Patrick's Cathedral in Dublin.

She also funded a mass to be celebrated daily for ever at the chapel of the Scots College in Paris for the benefit of her soul and for those of both her husbands as can still be read on the memorial plaque affixed to the wall of this church (see photo). The Latin inscription translates into English as:
To God, most good, most great.
To the most illustrious and noble Lady
Frances Jennings,
Duchess of Tyrconnell,
Lady-in-waiting of the Queen of Great Britain,
benefactrice of this College,
who founded a daily mass in this sanctuary
to be celebrated for ever
for her soul and those of Sir George
Hamilton of Abercorn, knight
her first husband, and Sir Richard Talbot,
duke of Tyrconnell, Viceroy of Ireland,
her second husband.
She died on 17 March 1731.
May she rest in peace.

As the memorial plaque is in France, the text gives the date of her death according to the Gregorian calendar, which had been adopted in France in 1582 but would be adopted in England only in 1752. This new-style date of death (17 March 1731) differs from the old-style one usually found in English texts (6 March 1731).

Notes and references

Notes

Citations

Sources 

 
 
 
  (for siblings Elizabeth, Thomas, John, Lucia, Margaret and daughters)
 
 
  – Ab-Adam to Basing (for Barnewall)
  – 1677 to 1678 (for daughter Henrietta)
  – England
  – (for timeline)
 
 
  – Princeps (for "la belle Jennings")
  (for the picture)
  (for English text)
 
  – 1689 to 1690
 
  – Translation from the original Latin published in Louvain in 1706
  – Abercorn to Balmerino
  – 1 January 1664 to 29/30 June 1665
  –  to 1685
  – 1686 to 1702
  – (Snippet view)
 
 
 
  – Westminster and the western suburbs
 
 
 

1640s births
1730 deaths
17th-century English women
17th-century English people
18th-century English people
18th-century English women
British maids of honour
Court of Charles II of England
English Jacobites
Irish countesses
People from St Albans (district)